Józef Jan Słowakiewicz (born 17 February 1945) is a Polish former ice hockey player. He played for Podhale Nowy Targ and Legia Warsaw during his career. With Podhale Słowakiewicz won the Polish hockey league championship eight times. He also played for the Polish national team at several World Championships as well as the 1972 Winter Olympics.

References

External links
 

1945 births
Living people
Ice hockey players at the 1972 Winter Olympics
Legia Warsaw (ice hockey) players
Olympic ice hockey players of Poland
People from Nowy Targ
Podhale Nowy Targ players
Polish ice hockey forwards